Michal Vepřek (born 17 June 1985) is a Czech football player who plays for Sigma Olomouc. 

At Sigma Olomouc Vepřek scored the winning goal in the final of the 2011–12 Czech Cup.

Honours 
SK Sigma Olomouc
 Czech Cup: 2011–12
 Czech Supercup: 2012

References

External links
 
 
 

1985 births
Living people
Czech footballers
Czech Republic youth international footballers
Czech Republic under-21 international footballers
SK Sigma Olomouc players
FC Vysočina Jihlava players
FK Viktoria Žižkov players

Association football defenders